Leabridge is a ward in the London Borough of Hackney and roughly corresponds to the Lea Bridge district of London, and is distinct from the Lea Bridge ward in the neighbouring London Borough of Waltham Forest. It is part of Hackney North and Stoke Newington constituency. The ward has existed since the creation of the borough on 1 April 1965 and was first used in the 1964 elections.

1965–1978
Leabridge ward has existed since the creation of the London Borough of Hackney on 1 April 1965. It was first used in the 1964 elections, with an electorate of 8,725, returning three councillors.

1978–2002
There was a revision of ward boundaries in Hackney in 1978.

2002–2014
There was a revision of ward boundaries in Hackney in 2002. The ward returns three councillors to Hackney London Borough Council, with elections every four years. At the last elections on 6 May 2010, Linda Kelly, Deniz Oguzkanli, and Ian Rathbone, all Labour Party candidates, were returned. Turnout was 55%; with 4,999 votes cast. Rathbone is a former speaker of the borough. Kelly left Labour and joined the Tories on 18 May 2011.

In 2001, Leabridge ward had a total population of 9,863 and was the ward with the fewest residents in Hackney. At the 2011 Census the population had increased to 14,039.   This compares with the average ward population within the borough of 10,674.

Hackney wards are redrawn and the ward is abolished from the May 2014 election. Most of the Leabridge ward becomes part of a new ward of Lea Bridge with part in the north going to Springfield. The new ward of Lea Bridge also includes part of the abolished Chatham ward.

References

External links
 London Borough of Hackney list of constituencies and councillors.
 Labour Party profile of Linda Kelly.
 Labour Party profile of Deniz Oguzkanli.
 Labour Party profile of Ian Rathbone.

Wards of the London Borough of Hackney
2014 disestablishments in England
1965 establishments in England